Schistocerca flavofasciata is a species of bird grasshopper in the family Acrididae. It is found in South America.

References

Further reading

External links

 

Cyrtacanthacridinae